Fantastica Mania 2012 was the name of two professional wrestling major shows produced that took place on January 21 and January 22, 2012 in Korakuen Hall in Tokyo, Japan. The event was the second ever co-promoted events between Japanese New Japan Pro-Wrestling (NJPW) and the Mexican Consejo Mundial de Lucha Libre (CMLL) and featured matches with wrestlers from both promotions.

The main event of the first night, a tag team match, where New Japan wrestler Kazuchika Okada and CMLL wrestler Volador Jr. defeated IWGP Heavyweight Champion Hiroshi Tanahashi and NWA World Historic Welterweight Champion La Sombra, built to not only Volador Jr. challenging for the NWA World Historic Welterweight Championship on the second night, but also to Okada challenging for the IWGP Heavyweight Championship on February 12 at New Japan's The New Beginning pay-per-view. The first night also featured New Japan wrestler Kushida submitting CMLL World Welterweight Champion Máscara Dorada on his way to a title match on the second night, and an appearance from CMLL World Women's Champion Ayumi Kurihara. During the second night both Máscara Dorada and La Sombra successfully defended their CMLL championships.

Background
Each of the events featured six professional wrestling matches, some with different wrestlers involved in pre-existing scripted feuds or storylines while other matches were the first time some wrestlers faced off. The Fantastica Mania events was the result of several years of co-operation between New Japan Pro-Wrestling and Consejo Mundial de Lucha Libre, which had seen both companies exchange wrestlers for various events.

Results

January 21

January 22

See also
2012 in professional wrestling

References

2012 in professional wrestling
2012
2012 in Tokyo
January 2012 events in Japan
Professional wrestling in Tokyo